The Lunar 100 (L100) is a list of one hundred of the most interesting features to observe on the Moon. The list was first described by Charles A. Wood in the article The Lunar 100 in Sky & Telescope magazine, April 2004.

With this selection, Wood tried to give astronomy fans a list similar to the Messier catalog of deep-sky objects, but of a more familiar object, the Moon. The objects listed include craters, seas, mountains and other features, and are arranged in ascending order of observational difficulty. The Moon is L1, L2 is Earthshine, L3 is the contrast between the dark seas and the lighter highlands. Starting from L4 we have geological features, such as craters (Tycho, L6), valleys (Vallis Schröteri, L17) and mountains (Leibnitz Mountains, L96). The last entry is L100, the magnetic swirls of Marginis Sea.

Lunar 100 - list

References

Moon
Moon-related lists